"Take Your Mama" is a song by American band Scissor Sisters, included as the second track on their self-titled debut album (2004). The song, written by Babydaddy and Jake Shears at Shears' parents' horse farm in West Virginia, was inspired by Shears' coming out to his mother, whom he is close with. The lyrics portray a homosexual man showing his mother the activities of gay nightlife in order to bond with her following his coming out.

The single was released on March 29, 2004, peaking at number 17 on the UK Singles Chart and receiving a silver certification from the British Phonographic Industry (BPI) in December 2018. It also saw success in other regions, most notably in New Zealand, where it reached number 11 on the RIANZ Singles Chart. In Australia, where the song peaked at number 40, it was ranked number 23 on Triple J's Hottest 100 of 2004.

Track listings

UK 12-inch single
A1. "Take Your Mama" – 4:32
B1. "Take Your Mama" (Hot Chip remix) – 5:00
B2. "Take Your Mama" (acappella) – 4:32

UK 12-inch picture disc
A1. "Take Your Mama" – 4:32
B1. "The Backwoods Discotheque, Pt. II" – 4:25
B2. "Take Your Mama" (National Forest remix) – 5:37

UK CD single
 "Take Your Mama" – 4:32
 "The Backwoods Discotheque, Pt. II" – 4:25

European and Australian maxi-CD single
 "Take Your Mama" – 4:33
 "The Backwoods Discotheque, Pt. II" – 4:25
 "Get It Get It" – 3:48
 "Take Your Mama" (music video)

Charts

Certifications

Release history

References

External links
 Official website
 Underground Illusion - The Ultimate Scissor Sisters Database
 

2004 singles
2004 songs
LGBT-related songs
Polydor Records singles
Scissor Sisters songs
Songs written by Babydaddy
Songs written by Jake Shears
Universal Records singles